The 1906 Boston Americans season was the sixth season for the professional baseball franchise that later became known as the Boston Red Sox. The Americans finished last in the eight-team American League (AL) with a record of 49 wins and 105 losses,  games behind the Chicago White Sox. The team played its home games at Huntington Avenue Grounds.

Regular season 
Prior to the regular season, the team held spring training in Macon, Georgia.
 April 14: The regular season opens with a 2–1 loss in 12 innings to the New York Highlanders at Hilltop Park in New York City.
 April 17: In the home opener, the Americans lose to the visiting Highlanders, 4–3.
 May 25: After losing their first 20 games of the month, during which their record went from 6–7 to 6–27, the Americans break their losing streak with a 3–0 win over the visiting Chicago White Sox.
 August 25: Jimmy Collins manages his final game. Although Boston defeat the St. Louis Browns, 3–1, the Americans are in last place in the AL, with a record of 35–79 (with one tie). Collins remains with the team as a player.
 August 27: Outfielder Chick Stahl manages his first game, a 6–5 loss to the Cleveland Naps.
 September 1: In their longest game of the season, the Americans lose to the visiting Philadelphia Athletics, 4–1 in 24 innings.
 September 26: The team loses its 100th game of the season, falling to 46–100 with a 2–0 loss to the White Sox at South Side Park in Chicago.
 October 6: The regular season ends with a home loss to the Highlanders, 5–4.

Statistical leaders
The offense was led by Chick Stahl with 51 RBIs and four home runs, and Myron "Moose" Grimshaw with a .290 batting average. The pitching staff was led by Cy Young, who made 39 appearances (34 starts) and pitched 28 complete games with a 13–21 record and 3.19 ERA, while striking out 140 in  innings. Jesse Tannehill was the only member of the starting rotation with winning record, at 13–11, while Bill Dinneen had the rotation's lowest ERA, at 2.92.

Season standings 

The team had one game end in a tie; April 18 vs. New York Highlanders. Tie games are not counted in league standings, but player statistics during tie games are counted.

Record vs. opponents

Opening Day lineup 

Source:

Roster

Player stats

Batting

Starters by position
Note: Pos = Position; G = Games played; AB = At bats; H = Hits; Avg. = Batting average; HR = Home runs; RBI = Runs batted in

Other batters 
Note: G = Games played; AB = At bats; H = Hits; Avg. = Batting average; HR = Home runs; RBI = Runs batted in

Pitching 
Note: G = Games pitched; IP = Innings pitched; W = Wins; L = Losses; ERA = Earned run average; SO = Strikeouts

Starting pitchers

Other pitchers 
Note: G = Games pitched; IP = Innings pitched; W = Wins; L = Losses; ERA = Earned run average; SO = Strikeouts

Relief pitchers 
Note: G = Games pitched; W = Wins; L = Losses; SV = Saves; ERA = Earned run average; SO = Strikeouts

References

External links
1906 Boston Americans at Baseball Reference
1906 Boston Americans season at Baseball Almanac

Boston Red Sox seasons
Boston Americans
Boston Americans
1900s in Boston